The Tagantsev conspiracy (or the case of the Petrograd Military Organization) was a non-existent monarchist conspiracy fabricated by the Soviet secret police in 1921 to terrorize intellectuals who might be in a potential opposition to the ruling Bolshevik regime. As its result, more than 800 people, mostly from scientific and artistic communities in Petrograd (modern-day Saint Petersburg), were arrested on false terrorism charges, out of which 98 were executed and many were sent to concentration camps. Among the executed was the poet Nikolay Gumilev, the co-founder of the influential Acmeist movement. 

The affair was named after Vladimir Nikolaevich Tagantsev, a geographer and member of the Russian Academy of Sciences, who was arrested, tortured, and tricked into disclosing hundreds of names of people who did not like the Bolshevik regime. Among the security officers that manufactured the case was Yakov Agranov, who later became one of the chief organizers of Stalinist show trials and the Great Purge in the 1930s. The case was officially declared fabricated and its victims rehabilitated by Russian authorities in 1992.

Background
On December 5, 1920, all departments of the Soviet secret police Cheka received a top secret order from Feliks Dzerzhinsky to start creating false flag White Army organizations, "underground and terrorist groups" to facilitate finding "foreign agents on our territory". This was planned partially as a provocation, in order to identify potentially disloyal citizens who might wish to join the Bolsheviks' enemies. 

A few months later, in February 1921, the Kronstadt rebellion began. This was a left-wing uprising against the Bolshevik regime by soldiers and sailors. Additionally, the Bolsheviks understood that the majority of intelligentsia did not support them. On March 8, the Council of People's Commissars (Sovnarkom) send a letter to People's Commissariat for Education (Narkompros) asking to identify a group of unreliable intellectuals who could be a target of future repressions.

On June 4, Bolshevik leader Vladimir Lenin received a telegram from Leonid Krasin about a convention of monarchists, cadets and right-wing members of the Socialist-Revolutionary Party in Paris who anticipated an uprising against Bolsheviks in Petrograd. Lenin sent a telegram to Cheka co-founder Józef Unszlicht stating that he did not trust the Cheka in Petrograd any longer. In the telegram, he issued an order to urgently send "the most experienced Chekists to Piter" and find the conspirators. This was a signal for the Cheka in Petrograd to fabricate the case.

The case

On May 31, Yuri German, a former officer of Imperial Russian Army and a Finnish spy, was killed while crossing the Finnish border. He had a notebook with numerous addresses, one of which belonged to professor Vladimir Tagantsev, who was previously identified by Cheka agents as an "disloyal person". Tagantsev and other people whose addresses were found in the notebook were arrested. During the next month the investigators of Cheka worked hard to manufacture the case, but without much success. The arrested refused to admit any guilt. After intense interrogation, Tagantsev tried to hang himself on June 21. In addition, it was difficult to connect together so many completely unrelated people. 

On June 25, two investigators of Petrograd Cheka, Gubin and Popov, prepared a report, according to which the "organization included only Tagantsev and a few couriers and supporters," the conspirators planned "to establish common language between intelligentsia and masses," the "terror was not their intention," and German delivered news about current events to Tagantsev from abroad. According to report, "the organization of Tagantsev had no connection and received no support from the Finnish or other counter-intelligence organizations." The report also noted that "Tagantsev is a cabinet scientist who thought about his organization theoretically" and "was incapable of doing practical work." After this report, names of Gubin and Popov disappeared from the case, meaning they have been replaced by other investigators.

After the initial failure, Yakov Agranov was appointed to lead the case. He arrested more people and took Tagantsev for interrogation after keeping him for 45 days in solitary confinement. Agranov gave an ultimatum; if Tagantsev did not confess, then he and all other hostages would be executed after three hours, however, no one would be harmed if he agreed to cooperate. According to  publications by Russian emigrants, the agreement was even signed on paper and personally guaranteed by Vyacheslav Menzhinsky. After signing the agreement, Tagantsev called names of several hundred people who criticized the Bolshevik regime. All of them were arrested on July 31 and during the first days of August. 

According to official version invented by Agranov, the leaders of conspiracy included Tagantsev, Finnish spy German, and former colonel of Russian army Vycheslav Shvedov who acted under pseudonym "Vyacheslavsky" and shot two Chekists during his arrest. To make the conspiracy bigger, they included many completely unrelated people, including former aristocrats, contrabandists, suspicious people and wives of those who were already arrested. The newspaper The Petrograd Pravda published a report by the Petrograd Cheka that the military organization of Tagantsev planned to burn plants, kill people and commit other terrorism acts using weapons and dynamite.  

The most famous victim of the case was the poet Nikolay Gumilev. Gumilev was arrested by Cheka on August 3. He admitted that he thought about joining the Kronstadt rebellion if it were to spread to Petrograd and talked about this with Vyacheslavsky. Gumilev was executed by a firing squad, together with 60 other people on August 24 in the Kovalevsky Forest. Thirty-seven others were shot on October 3. Agranov commented about the operation: "Seventy percent of the Petrograd intelligentsia had one leg in the enemy camp. We had to burn that leg."

Aftermath
The action reportedly failed to terrify the population. According to academician Vladimir Vernadsky, the case "had a shocking effect and produced not a feeling of fear, but of hatred and contempt" against the Bolsheviks. After the Tagantsev case Lenin decided that it would be easier to exile undesired intellectuals.

See also
Prompartiya
Active measures
Red terror
Operation Trust
Syndicate-2

References

External links
Vladimir Tagantsev on memorial book of persecuted geologists (Extended version in Russian)
Diary of Vladimir Tagantsev 
Tagantsev conspiracy: the 90th anniversary of top secret case (Russian), interview with Yuri Chernyaev on RFERL, and its summary

False flag operations
Political and cultural purges
 
Soviet Union intelligence operations
Anti-intellectualism